Assisted Model Building with Energy Refinement (AMBER) is a family of force fields for molecular dynamics of biomolecules originally developed by Peter Kollman's group at the University of California, San Francisco.  AMBER is also the name for the molecular dynamics software package that simulates these force fields. It is maintained by an active collaboration between David Case at Rutgers University, Tom Cheatham at the University of Utah, Adrian Roitberg at University of Florida, Ken Merz at Michigan State University, Carlos Simmerling at Stony Brook University, Ray Luo at UC Irvine, and Junmei Wang at Encysive Pharmaceuticals.

Force field 
The term AMBER force field generally refers to the functional form used by the family of AMBER force fields. This form includes several parameters; each member of the family of AMBER force fields provides values for these parameters and has its own name.

Functional form 
The functional form of the AMBER force field is

 
Despite the term force field, this equation defines the potential energy of the system; the force is the derivative of this potential relative to position.

The meanings of right hand side terms are:
 First term (summing over bonds): represents the energy between covalently bonded atoms. This harmonic (ideal spring) force is a good approximation near the equilibrium bond length, but becomes increasingly poor as atoms separate.
 Second term (summing over angles): represents the energy due to the geometry of electron orbitals involved in covalent bonding.
 Third term (summing over torsions): represents the energy for twisting a bond due to bond order (e.g., double bonds) and neighboring bonds or lone pairs of electrons. One bond may have more than one of these terms, such that the total torsional energy is expressed as a Fourier series.

The form of the van der Waals energy is calculated using the equilibrium distance and well depth.

The form of the electrostatic energy used here assumes that the charges due to the protons and electrons in an atom can be represented by a single point charge (or in the case of parameter sets that employ lone pairs, a small number of point charges.)

Parameter sets 
To use the AMBER force field, it is necessary to have values for the parameters of the force field (e.g. force constants, equilibrium bond lengths and angles, charges). A fairly large number of these parameter sets exist, and are described in detail in the AMBER software user manual. Each parameter set has a name, and provides parameters for certain types of molecules.
Peptide, protein, and nucleic acid parameters are provided by parameter sets with names starting with "ff" and containing a two digit year number, for instance "ff99". As of 2018 the primary protein model used by the AMBER suit is the ff14SB force field.
 General AMBER force field (GAFF) provides parameters for small organic molecules to facilitate simulations of drugs and small molecule ligands in conjunction with biomolecules.
The GLYCAM force fields have been developed by Rob Woods for simulating carbohydrates.
The primary force field used in the AMBER suit for lipids is lipid14.

Software 
The AMBER software suite provides a set of programs to apply the AMBER forcefields to simulations of biomolecules. It is written in the programming languages Fortran 90 and C, with support for most major Unix-like operating systems and compilers. Development is conducted by a loose association of mostly academic labs. New versions are released usually in the spring of even numbered years; AMBER 10 was released in April 2008. The software is available under a site license agreement, which includes full source, currently priced at US$500 for non-commercial and US$20,000 for commercial organizations.

Programs 
 LEaP prepares input files for the simulation programs.
 Antechamber automates the process of parameterizing small organic molecules using GAFF.
 Simulated Annealing with NMR-Derived Energy Restraints (SANDER) is the central simulation program and provides facilities for energy minimizing and molecular dynamics with a wide variety of options.
 pmemd is a somewhat more feature-limited reimplementation of SANDER by Bob Duke. It was designed for parallel computing, and performs significantly better than SANDER when running on more than 8–16 processors.
 pmemd.cuda runs simulations on machines with graphics processing units (GPUs).
 pmemd.amoeba handles the extra parameters in the polarizable AMOEBA force field.
 nmode calculates normal modes.
 ptraj numerically analyzes simulation results. AMBER includes no visualizing abilities, which is commonly performed with Visual Molecular Dynamics (VMD). Ptraj is now unsupported as of AmberTools 13. 
 cpptraj is a rewritten version of ptraj made in C++ to give faster analysis of simulation results. Several actions have been made parallelizable with OpenMP and MPI.
 MM-PBSA allows implicit solvent calculations on snap shots from molecular dynamics simulations.
 NAB is a built-in nucleic acid building environment made to aid in the process of manipulating proteins and nucleic acids where an atomic level of description will aid computing.

See also

References

Related reading
1.

External links 
 
AMBER mailing list archive
Amber on the German HPC-C5 Cluster-Systems

Fortran software
Molecular dynamics software
Force fields